Brigg and Scunthorpe was a parliamentary constituency centred on the towns of Brigg and Scunthorpe in Humberside.  It returned one Member of Parliament (MP) to the House of Commons of the Parliament of the United Kingdom.

The constituency was created for the February 1974 general election, mostly from the former seat of Brigg, and abolished for the 1983 general election, when it was partially replaced by the new constituencies of Brigg & Cleethorpes and Glanford & Scunthorpe.

Boundaries 
The Borough of Scunthorpe, the Urban Districts of Barton-upon-Humber and Brigg, and the Rural District of Glanford Brigg.

Members of Parliament

Election results

Elections in the 1970s

References 

Parliamentary constituencies in Lincolnshire (historic)
Borough of North Lincolnshire
Constituencies of the Parliament of the United Kingdom established in 1974
Constituencies of the Parliament of the United Kingdom disestablished in 1983
Brigg